Federal Council for Protection of the Constitutional Order (Serbo-Croatian: Savezni sav(j)et za zaštitu ustavnog poretka, Slovene: Zvezni svet za zaščito ustavne ureditve, Macedonian: Сојузниот совет за заштита на уставниот поредок) was an agency of the Presidency of the Socialist Federal Republic of Yugoslavia in charge of coordination of country's internal security institutions. It was created in 1975, in accordance with Article 331 of the 1974 Yugoslav Constitution, and ceased to exist following the breakup of Yugoslavia in 1991–1992.

The council had eight members. Four members were appointed directly by the Presidency: three out of its own members and one out of the leadership of the League of Communists of Yugoslavia. The other members were Yugoslav prime minister, ministers of interior, national defense and foreign affairs. The chairmen of the council since its creation were:

 Vladimir Bakarić (1975–1982)
 Lazar Koliševski (1982–1984)
 Stane Dolanc (1984–1989)
 Janez Drnovšek (1989)
 Borisav Jović (1989–1991)

Members ex officio

References 

Socialist Federal Republic of Yugoslavia